KSHK (103.1 FM) is a radio station broadcasting a classic rock format. Licensed to Hanamaulu, Hawaii, United States, the station serves the Kauai area. The station is currently owned by Pacific Media Group, through licensee Pacific Radio Group, Inc.

The station is an affiliate of the syndicated Floydian Slip Pink Floyd show. The station has an eclectic mix of rock and roll, mostly classic. The Alice Cooper syndicated radio show is featured daily. Little Steven's Underground Garage radio show is also featured.

History
The station went on the air as KAUI on September 20, 1989. On March 8, 1999, the station changed its call sign to the current KSHK.

References

External links

Ohana Broadcast Company, LLC stations
SHK
Radio stations established in 1989